Benjamin "Ben" Ryan is an Australian rules football umpire who officiated in the Australian Football League.

He started his umpiring career in Queensland, officiating in the 2008, '09, and '10 Queensland Australian Football League Grand Finals. He was appointed to the AFL list in 2011 and made his debut in Round 3 of that year, in a match between the Western Bulldogs and Gold Coast. He left the AFL list at the end of the 2017 season after 122 games.

References

Living people
Australian Football League umpires
Year of birth missing (living people)